Major General Sir Leonard Henry Atkinson,  (4 December 1910 – 17 May 1990) was a British engineer and senior British Army officer. He served as Director of Electrical and Mechanical Engineering, and therefore head of the Royal Electrical and Mechanical Engineers, from 1963 to 1966. In retirement, he served on the board of a number of engineering companies, and was Master of the Worshipful Company of Turners (1987–1988).

References

1910 births
1990 deaths
British military engineers
Knights Commander of the Order of the British Empire
Royal Electrical and Mechanical Engineers officers
British Army major generals
British Army personnel of World War II